Anastomopteryx is a genus of moth in the family Gelechiidae. It contains the species Anastomopteryx angulata, which is found in South Africa.

References

Endemic moths of South Africa
Anacampsinae
Monotypic moth genera
Moths of Africa